Lynn Townsend White Jr. (April 29, 1907 – March 30, 1987) was an American historian. He was a professor of medieval history at Princeton from 1933 to 1937, and at Stanford from 1937 to 1943. He was president of Mills College, Oakland, from 1943 to 1958 and a professor at University of California, Los Angeles from 1958 until 1987. Lynn White helped to found the Society for the History of Technology (SHOT) and was president from 1960 to 1962. He won the Pfizer Award for "Medieval Technology and Social Change" from the History of Science Society (HSS) and the Leonardo da Vinci medal and Dexter prize from SHOT in 1964 and 1970. He was president of the History of Science Society from 1971 to 1972. He was president of The Medieval Academy of America from 1972–1973, and the American Historical Association in 1973.

Biography
White began his career as medieval historian focusing on the history of Latin monasticism in Sicily during the Norman Period but realized the coming conflict in Europe would interfere with his access to source materials. While at Princeton he read the works of Richard Lefebvre des Noëttes, and Marc Bloch. This led to his first work in the history of technology, "Technology and Invention in the Middle Ages" in 1940.

Noettes was a retired French cavalry officer who made his hobby the history of horses. He wrote that the utilization of animals in antiquity was inefficient because the ancients were limited by the technologies of their period, specifically the lack of horseshoes and a bad harness design. White expanded Noettes’ conclusions into a thesis of his own that encompassed the relationship of the newly realized efficient horse and the agricultural revolution of the time.

White pointed to new methods of crop rotation and plowing and tied them to the rise of manor-based collective farming and the shift in European prosperity and power from the Mediterranean to the North. White also touched on the stirrup, the lateen sail, the wheel barrow, the spinning wheel, the hand crank, water-driven mills and wind mills. He concluded: "The chief glory of the later Middle Ages was not its cathedrals or its epics or its scholasticism: it was the building for the first time in history of a complex civilization which rested not on the backs of sweating slaves or coolies but primarily on non-human power" and he credited this as well as Western primacy in technology to Western theology's "activist" tradition and "implicit assumption of the infinite worth of even the most degraded human personality" and its "repugnance towards subjecting any man to monotonous drudgery."

In 1942, White published a paper titled "Christian Myth and Christian History" in which he wrote about the relationship between historians and Christianity. He wrote: "Having lost faith that God revealed himself uniquely at one single point in history, we are relapsing into the essentially static or repetitive view of the time-process typical of antiquity and of the East" and "the Virgin Mother, undefiled yet productive, bearing Christ into the world by the action of the Spirit of God, is so perfect an analogue of the most intimate experience of the soul, that powerful myth has sustained dubious history; for, to the believer, myth and history have been one" and "Christianity above all other religions has rashly insisted that its myth really happened in time" and "we stand amid the debris of our inherited religious system." White held out hope for a Christianity that celebrated its myths and made no pretensions to history, and saw Catholicism as the most progressive in this respect.

At Mills College, White published on education and women, including "Women's Colleges and the Male Dominance" (1947), "Unfitting Women for Life" (1949), "Educating Women in a Man's World" (1950), and "The Future of Women's Education" (1953).

He was an elected member of both the American Academy of Arts and Sciences (1956) and the American Philosophical Society (1968).

Medieval technology and social change
At UCLA, he used a set of lectures from 1957 to form his best-known work, Medieval Technology and Social Change in 1962. This book revisited almost all the themes from "Technology and Invention in the Middle Ages" 22 years earlier, but included a controversial theory about the stirrup. White contended in the first section of the book that the stirrup made shock combat possible, and therefore had a crucial role in shaping the feudal system. He believed this motivated Charles Martel to accelerate confiscation of church-held lands to distribute to his knights, who  could then bear the cost of expensive horses themselves to support him in battle. In the second section of the book, White explained the shift in power from the Mediterranean to Northern Europe as a result of increased productivity due to technological changes that produced a "heavy plow," better harnesses for horses to pull the plow, and a three-field crop rotation scheme. In the third part of the book, he examined medieval machines that converted motion and energy. The most notable was the compound crank. The work elicited over 30 reviews, many of which were hostile. P. H. Sawyer and R. H. Hilton wrote the most scathing of the early reviews, beginning with:

"Technical determinism in historical studies has often been combined with adventurous speculations particularly attractive to those who like to have complex developments explained by simple causes. The technical determinism of Professor Lynn White Jr., however, is peculiar in that, instead of building new and provocative theories about general historical development on the basis of technical studies, he gives a misleadingly adventurist cast to old-fashioned platitudes by supporting them with a chain of obscure and dubious deductions from scanty evidence about the progress of technology."

Nevertheless, the book remains in print and still stands as a seminal work in the field.

The historical roots of present-day ecologic crisis
In 1967, White conjectured that the Christian influences in the Middle Ages were at the root of ecological crisis in the 20th century. He gave a lecture on December 26, 1966, titled, "The Historical Roots of Our Ecologic Crisis" at the Washington meeting of the AAAS, that was later published in the journal Science. White's article was based on the premise that "all forms of life modify their context", i.e. every living organism in some way alters its environment or habitat. He believed man's relationship with the natural environment was always a dynamic and interactive one, even in the Middle Ages, but marked the Industrial Revolution as a fundamental turning point in our ecological history. He suggests that at this point the hypotheses of science were married to the possibilities of technology and our ability to destroy and exploit the environment was vastly increased. Nevertheless, he also suggests that the mentality of the Industrial Revolution, that the earth was a resource for human consumption, was much older than the actuality of machinery, and has its roots in medieval Christianity and attitudes towards nature. He suggests that "what people do about their ecology depends on what they think about themselves in relation to things around them." Citing the Genesis creation story he argued that Judeo-Christian theology had swept away pagan animism and normalized exploitation of the natural world because:

The Bible asserts man's dominion over nature and establishes a trend of anthropocentrism.
Christianity makes a distinction between man (formed in God's image) and the rest of creation, which has no "soul" or "reason" and is thus inferior.

He posited that these beliefs have led to an indifference towards nature which continues to impact in an industrial, "post-Christian" world. He concludes that applying more science and technology to the problem will not help, that it is humanity's fundamental ideas about nature that must change; we must abandon "superior, contemptuous" attitudes that makes us "willing to use it [the earth] for our slightest whim." White suggests adopting St. Francis of Assisi as a model in imagining a "democracy" of creation in which all creatures are respected and man's rule over creation is delimited.

The debate

White's ideas set off an extended debate about the role of religion in creating and sustaining the West's destructive attitude towards the exploitation of the natural world. It also galvanized interest in the relationship between history, nature and the evolution of ideas, thus stimulating new fields of study like environmental history and ecotheology. Equally, however, many saw his argument as a direct attack on Christianity and other commentators think his analysis of the impact of the Bible, and especially Genesis is misguided. They argue that Genesis provides man with a model of "stewardship" rather than dominion, and asks man to take care of the world's environment. Others, such as Lewis W. Montcrief, argue that our relation to the environment has been influenced by many more varied and complex cultural/historical phenomena, and that the result we see today cannot simply be reduced to the influence of the Judeo-Christian tradition. Later responses to his article include criticism not just of the central argument but also of the validity of his suggestion "I propose Francis as a patron saint for ecologists." Jan J Boersema's article "Why is St Francis of Assisi the patron saint of ecologists?" in Science and Christian Belief 2002 (vol 14 pp. 51–77). Boersema argues that the historical evidence for Francis's status as such a patron saint is weak both in Francis' own writings and in the reliable sources about his life.

Medieval technology and religion
White was an historian, but had also earned a master's degree at Union Theological Seminary and was the son of a Calvinist professor of Christian ethics, and considered religion integral to the development of Western technology. From his Technology and Invention in the Middle Ages of 1940, through his Dynamo and Virgin Reconsidered of 1958, to his Medieval Technology and Social Change (Oxford University Press, 1962), his work refuted the assumption that the Middle Ages were too preoccupied with theology and/or chivalry to concern themselves with technology, the assumption behind Henry Adams' antitheses of Virgin vs. dynamo, but widespread elsewhere as well.

White's view of writing history
His work tied together that of many predecessors, above all that of Marc Bloch, to whose memory Medieval Technology and Social Change is dedicated. White argued, "Since, until recent centuries, technology was chiefly the concern of groups which wrote little, the role which technological development plays in human affairs has been neglected," and declared, "If historians are to attempt to write the history of mankind, and not simply the history of mankind as it was viewed by the small and specialized segments of our race which have had the habit of scribbling, they must take a fresh view of the records, ask new questions of them, and use all the resources of archaeology, iconography, and etymology to find answers when no answers can be discovered in contemporary writings."

See also
 Deep ecology
 Religion and environmentalism

References

Bibliography

Further reading
Lynn Townsend White Jr., Medieval Religion and Technology (University of California Press, 1978). Collection of nineteen of his papers published elsewhere between 1940 and 1975.
Lynn White Jr., "The Changing Past", Harper’s Magazine, (November 1954), 29–34.
Elspeth Whitney, "Lynn White Jr.’s 'The Historical Roots of Our Ecologic Crisis' After 50 Years", History Compass, 2015, Vol.13(8), 396–410. 
Shana Worthen, "The Influence of Lynn White Jr.'s Medieval Technology and Social Change", History Compass, 2009, Vol.7(4),1201–1217. 

1907 births
1987 deaths
20th-century American historians
American male non-fiction writers
American medievalists
American historians of science
Historians of technology
Leonardo da Vinci Medal recipients
Presidents of the American Historical Association
Presidents of Mills College
Princeton University faculty
Stanford University faculty
Fellows of the Medieval Academy of America
20th-century American male writers
Union Theological Seminary (New York City) alumni
Members of the American Philosophical Society
20th-century American academics